"I Want a Woman" is a song by American heavy metal band Ratt.

Background 
It is the second track on the group's fourth album Reach for the Sky and the second single released by Atlantic Records to promote the record. The song is also on their greatest hits album, Ratt & Roll 81-91.

"I Want a Woman" was composed by Ratt members Robbin Crosby, Juan Croucier and Stephen Pearcy, as well as producer Beau Hill.

The video for this song was partially shot at The Palace of Auburn Hills in Auburn Hills, Michigan on January 28, 1989.

Track listing 
"I Want a Woman" - 3:58
"What I'm After" - 3:35

Personnel 
Stephen Pearcy - Vocals
Warren DeMartini - co-Lead Guitar
Robbin Crosby - co-Lead Guitar
Juan Croucier - Bass Guitar
Bobby Blotzer - Drums

See also 
Ratt
Reach for the Sky

Ratt songs
1988 singles
Song recordings produced by Beau Hill
Songs written by Stephen Pearcy
Songs written by Juan Croucier
Songs written by Robbin Crosby
Songs written by Beau Hill
1988 songs
Atlantic Records singles